Volgograd Oblast is a federal subject (an oblast) of Russia, located in the lower Volga region of Southern Russia. Its administrative center is Volgograd. The population of the oblast was 2,610,161 in the 2010 Census. 

Formerly known as Stalingrad Oblast, it was given its present name in 1961, when the city of Stalingrad was renamed Volgograd as part of de-Stalinization. Volgograd Oblast borders Rostov Oblast in the southwest, Voronezh Oblast in the northwest, Saratov Oblast in the north, Astrakhan Oblast and the Republic of Kalmykia in the southeast, and has an international border with Kazakhstan in the east. The two main rivers in European Russia, the Don and the Volga, run through the oblast and are connected by the Volga–Don Canal. Volgograd Oblast's strategic waterways have made it a popular route for shipping and for the generation of hydroelectricity.

Volgograd Oblast was the primary site of the Battle of Stalingrad during World War II, often regarded as one of the single largest and the bloodiest battles in the history of warfare.

Geography
Borders length: 

Volgograd Oblast borders with Saratov, Rostov, Astrakhan, and Voronezh Oblasts, as well as with Kalmykia of Russia and with Kazakhstan (West Kazakhstan Region). 
Most of Volgograd oblast is located in the Pontic–Caspian steppe. The Yergeni hills are located to the southeast. Forests cover 4% of the territory.
The major rivers are:
The Volga River
The Don River
The Medveditsa River
The Khopyor River

History
Stalingrad Oblast was established on December 5, 1936 on the territory of former Stalingrad Krai. The oblast was given its present name on November 10, 1961.

Administrative divisions

Politics

During the Soviet period, three people exercised oblast-level authority:
the first secretary of the Volgograd CPSU Committee (who in reality had the most power)
the chairman of the oblast Soviet (legislative power)
the chairman of the oblast Executive Committee (executive power)

In 1991 the CPSU lost de facto power, and the head of the Oblast administration, and eventually the governor was appointed/elected alongside elected regional parliament.

The Charter of Volgograd Oblast provides the fundamental law of the region. The Legislative Assembly of Volgograd Oblast is the province's standing legislative (representative) body. The Legislative Assembly exercises its authority by passing laws, resolutions, and other legal acts and by supervising the implementation and observance of the laws and other legal acts passed by it. The highest executive body, the Oblast Government, includes territorial executive bodies such as district administrations, committees, and commissions that facilitate development and run the day-to-day matters of the province. The Oblast administration supports the activities of the Governor, who is the highest official and acts as guarantor of the observance of the oblast Charter in accordance with the Constitution of Russia.

Demographics

The population of the oblast was 2,610,161 according to the 2010 Russian census, 2,699,223 in the 2002 Russian census, and 2,593,944 in the 1989 Soviet census. In 2012, there were 30,252 births (11.7 per 1000) and 35,021 deaths (13.5 per 1000). The total fertility rate was 1.46 in 2009, rising to 1.57 by 2016.

Life expectancy:

Settlements

Ethnic groups
(shown are the ethnic groups with a population of more than 7,000 people)

44,541 people were registered from administrative databases, and could not declare an ethnicity. It is estimated that the proportion of ethnicities in this group is the same as that of the declared group.

Religion

According to a 2012 survey 54.5% of the population of Volgograd Oblast adheres to the Russian Orthodox Church, 4% are unaffiliated generic Christians, 2% are Eastern Orthodox Christian believers who don't belong to any church or are members of non-Russian Eastern Orthodox churches, 3% are Muslims. In addition, 18% of the population declares to be "spiritual but not religious", 12% is atheist, and 6.5% follows other religions or did not give an answer to the question.

Government
Governor of Volgograd Oblast is Андрей Бочаров (since 2014)

Both the flag and the coat of arms of Volgograd Oblast include an image of The Motherland Calls, an 85 meter tall statue located in Volgograd.

Economy

Primary branches of economics are agriculture, food production, heavy industry, gas and petroleum refining. The Volga Hydroelectric Station operates on the Volga River.

The largest companies in the region include Volzhsky Pipe Plant, Volgogradenergosbyt (a local electric power distribution company), OJSC Kaustik (caustic soda manufacturer), Volzhsky Orgsintez (a chemical plant).

See also
List of Chairmen of the Volgograd Oblast Duma
Volgograd floating landing

References

Notes

Sources

Исполнительный комитет Волгоградского областного Совета депутатов трудящихся. "Волгоградская область. Административно-территориальное деление на 1 июля 1968 года" (Volgograd Oblast. Administrative-Territorial Structure as of July 1, 1968). Нижне-Волжское книжное издательство. Волгоград, 1969.

External links

 Official website of Volgograd Oblast
Central Eurasian Information Resource: Images of Volgograd Oblast – University of Washington Digital Collections

 
States and territories established in 1936
Southern Federal District